General Richards may refer to:

David Richards, Baron Richards of Herstmonceux (born 1952), British Army general
George Richards (British Army officer) (1898–1978), British Army major general
George Richards (Marine Corps) (1872–1948), U.S. Marine Corps major general
George Jacob Richards (1891–1984), U.S. Army major general 
John Richards (Royal Marines officer) (1927–2004), Royal Marines lieutenant general
Michael Richards (engineer) (1673–1721), British Army brigadier general
Nigel Richards (British Army officer) (1945–2019), British Army major general
Thomas C. Richards (1930–2020), U.S. Air Force general

See also
Ronald G. Richard (born 1946), U.S. Marine Corps major general
Virgil A. Richard (1937–2013), U.S. Army brigadier general 
Attorney General Richards (disambiguation)